Michail Elgin and Alexandre Kudryavtsev were the defending champions, but only Elgin tried to defend his title.
He partnered with Sergei Bubka, however lost to Frank Moser and Björn Phau already in the first round.
Jonathan Marray and Jamie Murray won this tournament, by defeating David Martin and Rogier Wassen 4–6, 6–3, [10–5] in the final match.

Seeds

Draw

Draw

References
 Doubles Draw

President's Cup - Doubles
2009 Doubles